Calvatia arctica is a species of puffball mushroom in the family Agaricaceae. Found in Greenland, it was first described scientifically by Carl Christian Frederic Ferdinandsen and Øjvind Winge in a 1910 publication.

References

Agaricaceae
Fungi described in 1910